Marly may refer to:

People
 Florence Marly (1919–1978), Czech-born French film actress

Places

France
 Marly, Moselle, in the Moselle département
 Marly, Nord, in the Nord département
 Marly-Gomont, in the Aisne département
 Marly-la-Ville, in the Val-d'Oise département
 Marly-le-Roi, in the Yvelines département
 Château de Marly, a former royal residence
 Marly-sous-Issy, in the Saône-et-Loire département
 Marly-sur-Arroux, in the Saône-et-Loire département

Switzerland
 Marly, Fribourg, in the Canton of Fribourg

Colombia
 Marly, neighbourhood in Bogotá.
 Marly (TransMilenio), a station in the rapid-transit system of Bogotá

Things
 Machine de Marly, 1684 hydraulic system in Yvelines, France

See also 
Marl (disambiguation)
Marley (disambiguation)